Datsun 2000 may refer to one of the following Datsun cars:

 Datsun Sports - sold in some export markets as the Datsun 2000
 Nissan Cedric - sold in some export markets as the Datsun 2000

2000